Princess Tamar Mikheilis Asuli Bagration-Imeretinsky (born 1926) is a Georgian royal princess (batonishvili) of the royal Bagrationi dynasty of Imereti.

Princess Tamar was born on 5 December 1926 and is a daughter of Prince Michael Imeretinsky (1900–1975) and Margaret Stella Wright (1899–1987). Tamar is a descendant of King George VII of Imereti.

She married, firstly, Thomas Mervyn Smith-Dorrien-Smith, son of Arthur Dorrien-Smith on 21 July 1945 at London, England. She and Thomas were divorced in 1967.

She married, secondly, Charles Strachey, 4th Baron O'Hagan, on 13 July 1967 at London, England. They were divorced in 1984.

Princess Tamar with Thomas Mervyn Smith-Dorrien-Smith had 5 children:
Teona Judith Smith-Dorrien-Smith (born 1946)
Alexandra Smith-Dorrien-Smith (1948–2007)
Robert Arthur Smith-Dorrien-Smith (born 1951)
Charlotte Sophia Smith-Dorrien-Smith (1954–1997)
James Smith-Dorrien-Smith (born 1957)

Princess Tamar with Charles Strachey, 4th Baron O'Hagan, had 1 child:
Hon. Nino Natalia O'Hagan Strachey (born 1968)

References

1926 births
Princesses from Georgia (country)
Bagrationi dynasty of the Kingdom of Imereti
Possibly living people
Tamara
English people of Georgian descent
English people of Russian descent
O'Hagan